Gilbert Itzicsohn (born 17 August 1944) is a French ice hockey player. He competed in the men's tournament at the 1968 Winter Olympics.

References

1944 births
Living people
Olympic ice hockey players of France
Ice hockey players at the 1968 Winter Olympics
Ice hockey people from Paris